Tonna tessellata, the mosaic tun, tessellate tun or maculated tun, is a species of large sea snail, a marine gastropod mollusk in the family Tonnidae.

Description
It is a relatively thin and light weight shell, nearly spherical. The body whorl is inflated, with a very wide aperture. Surface is white, smooth and glossy, with distinctive brown-red markings and sculptured by thick spiral ribs. It lacks the operculum. This sea snail feeds on crustaceans, sea urchins and fishes.

Distribution
This species is widespread from South Africa, Madagascar and Western Pacific to Australia, New Zealand, Thailand, Indonesia, Papua New Guinea, Vietnam, Philippines and Japan. It lives in sandy seabed, at depths of 0 to 50 m.

References

 Morton, B. & Morton, J. (1983). The sea shore ecology of Hong Kong. Hong Kong: Hong Kong University Press. 350 pp.
 Vos, C. (2007) A conchological Iconography (No. 13) - The family Tonnidae. 123 pp., 30 numb. plus 41 (1 col.) un-numb. text-figs, 33 maps., 63 col. pls, Conchbooks, Germany
 Cernohorsky. W. O. (1972). Marine Shells of the Pacific. Vol. II. Pacific Publications, Sydney, 411 pp.
 Beu, A. G. (2005) Neogene fossil tonnoidean gastropods of Indonesia. Scripta Geologica 130, p. 1-186, pp. 166, figs. 327
 Vos, C. (2008) Tonnidae. in Poppe G.T. (ed.) Philippine Marine Mollusks, Volume 1: Gastropoda 1: 594-611, pls 242-250. Conchbooks, Hackenheim, Germany.
 Vos, C. (2012) Overview of the Tonnidae (MOLLUSCA: GASTROPODA) in Chinese waters. Shell Discoveries 1(1); pp. 12-22; Pls. 1-9
 Vos, C. (2013) Overview of the Tonnidae (Mollusca: Gastropoda) in Chinese waters. Gloria Maris 52(1-2); pp. 22-53; Pls. 1-9
 Steyn, D. G.; Lussi, M. (2005). Offshore Shells of Southern Africa: A pictorial guide to more than 750 Gastropods. Published by the authors. pp. i–vi, 1–289

External links
 Gastropods
 Encyclopaedia of Life
 Sea Life Base
 Bumblebee
 Lamarck, J. B. P. A. de M. de. (1816). Tableau encyclopédique et méthodique des trois règnes de la nature, Mollusques et polypes divers. Part 23 [Livraison 84, 14 December 1816, Tome 3, pp. 1-16, pls. 391-431, 431 bis, 431 bis*, 432-488, Paris: Vve Agasse]
 Röding, P. F. (1798). Museum Boltenianum sive Catalogus cimeliorum e tribus regnis naturæ quæ olim collegerat Joa. Fried Bolten, M. D. p. d. per XL. annos proto physicus Hamburgensis. Pars secunda continens Conchylia sive Testacea univalvia, bivalvia & multivalvia. Trapp, Hamburg. viii, 199 pp
 Sowerby, G. B. I. (1821-1834). The genera of recent and fossil shells, for the use of students, in conchology and geology. Published in 42 numbers. Vol. 1, pls 1-126
 Deshayes, G. P. & Milne-Edwards, H. (1844). Histoire naturelle des animaux sans vertèbres, présentant les caractères généraux et particuliers de ces animaux, leur distribution, leurs classes, leurs familles, leurs genres, et la citation des principales espèces qui s'y rapportent, par J. B. P. A. de Lamarck. Deuxième édition, Tome dixième. Histoire des Mollusques. J. B. Baillière: Paris. 638 pp.
 Tapparone Canefri, C. (1878). Catalogue des coquilles rapportées de la Nouvelle-Guinée par M. Raffray. Bulletin de la Société Zoologique de France. 3: 244-277, pl. 6
 Barnard, K. H. (1963). Contributions to the knowledge of South African marine Mollusca. Part III. Gastropoda: Prosobranchiata: Taenioglossa. i>Annals of the South African Museum 47(1): 1-199

Tonnidae
Taxa named by Jean-Baptiste Lamarck
Gastropods described in 1816